Francis Sydney Dove MM (3 September 1897 – 10 February 1957) was a British boxer who competed in the 1920 Summer Olympics in Antwerp, Belgium. In 1920 he was eliminated in the quarter-finals of the heavyweight class after losing his fight to the upcoming silver medallist Søren Petersen. After the outbreak of World War I, Dove joined the British Army and won the Military Medal for bravery during the Battle of Cambrai (1917).

Biography
Frank Dove was born of mixed race in London; his English mother Augusta, née Winchester (3 March 1877 – 31 January 1947), was from Sussex, his father Francis (Frans) Thomas Dove (c. 1869–22 August 1949) was a Sierra Leone Creole, who was a highly respected barrister in Freetown. Frank's younger sister was singer and actress Evelyn Dove.

In 1910 he was sent to Cranleigh School, where he was one of the school's first black pupils. A successful sportsman there, he was in the 1st XI for football and cricket and was Hon. Secretary of both sports. He was also one of the two gymnasts who represented Cranleigh at the Public Schools Gymnastic Competition at Aldershot – at the time a major event that Cranleigh had won five times, most recently in 1913 – where the school finished third overall.  The school magazine said he was "a versatile member of the community both academically and athletically".

He left in July 1915 and went on to Merton College, Oxford, where he was reading law in November 1916 when, aged 19, he was called up for service and enlisted in the British Army, giving his home address as Brighton. He joined the Royal Tank Corps in "E" battalion, where initially he served as a dispatch rider (under Second Lieutenant Johnson), and subsequently fought at the battle of Cambrai in 1917, winning the Military Medal for his bravery at the Battle of Cambrai in November 1917. In June 1918, aged 20, Dove joined the Cadet Unit of the RAF.

After being demobbed in 1920, he returned to Oxford. While there he boxed for the university and also for Great Britain at the 1920 Antwerp Olympics. He continued to box while practising as a barrister and was still winning ABA divisional cruiser-weight championships in 1945, by which time he was 48.

He died on 10 February 1957 after being involved in a traffic accident in Wolverhampton. His story featured in Stephen Bourne's book Black Poppies: Britain's Black Community and the Great War, which was published in 2014.

References

External links

1897 births
1957 deaths
Heavyweight boxers
Olympic boxers of Great Britain
Sierra Leone Creole people
Boxers at the 1920 Summer Olympics
Alumni of Merton College, Oxford
English male boxers
Boxers from Greater London
People educated at Cranleigh School
English sportspeople of Sierra Leonean descent
Royal Tank Regiment soldiers
Royal Air Force airmen
British Army personnel of World War I
Recipients of the Military Medal
English barristers
Road incident deaths in England
20th-century English lawyers
Royal Air Force personnel of World War I